The 2022–23 Scottish Cup, is the national cup competition in Scottish women's football.

Results
All results listed are published by Scottish Football Association (SFA).

Preliminary round
The draw for the preliminary round took place on Friday 2 September 2022 at Hampden Park. Alloa Athletic, Bonnyrigg Rose, Buchan Ladies United, Clydebank, Dunipace, Linlithgow Rose, Queen of the South, Stewarton United, Stonehaven and West Park United received a bye to the first round. The preliminary-round games which were due to take place on Sunday 11 September 2022 were postponed by the SFA due to the death of Elizabeth II.

Brora Rangers, Orkney and Nithsdale Wanderers forfeited the games and Clachnacuddin, Harmony Row and Central Girls progressed to the first round.

First round
The draw for the first round took place on Thursday 15 September 2022.

Second round
The draw for the second round took place on Wednesday 12 October 2022.

Third round
The draw for the third round took place on Wednesday 12 October 2022 at Hampden Park.

Fourth round
The draw for the fourth round took place on Tuesday 6 December 2022 at Meggetland Sports Complex in Edinburgh.

Fifth round
The draw for the fifth round took place on Tuesday 9 January 2022 at Hampden Park in Glasgow.

Quarter-finals
The draw for the quarter-finals took place on Tuesday 13 February 2023 at Hampden Park in Glasgow.

Semi-finals
The draw for the semi-finals took place on Sunday 19 March 2023 at Hampden Park in Glasgow.

References

External links
Scottish Women's Cup at Soccerway
Scottish Football Historical Results Archive
SFA Scottish Women's Cup

Scot
Premier League
Scottish Women's Cup